Riksfriherre Sir Johan Fredrik von Friesendorff, 1st Baronet (1617–1669) was a Swedish diplomat born in Bremen.

Early life 
His father was Hieronymus von Friesendorff (b. 1565), the Amtmann (prefect) of Rotenburg an der Wümme and Bremervörde, and his mother was from the von Buchwald family.

Career 
His ability was recognised by the Swedish Lord High Treasurer Gabriel Oxenstierna, and he was appointed as Swedish resident in Portugal by him in 1649, and then appointed as a member of the Swedish Cabinet four years later. In 1656 he married Margareta Elisabet Gärffelt.

Shrewd and with a thorough knowledge of cabinet- and trade secrets, he was used by the Swedish state in many negotiations and diplomatic endeavours, including finishing an alliance with England in 1661, when he was also dubbed an English knight and created a baronet by Charles II (under the name of "Sir John Frederick van Freisendorf"). A few years later he was appointed Reichsfreiherr by the Emperor Leopold, and was also given the titles Counsellor of the Court and member of the National Board of Trade in Sweden.

Children 
His sons were raised to Swedish friherre dignity by King Charles XII in 1705. 
 Friherre Sir Johan Fridrich Frisendorph, 2nd Baronet (1657–1725)
 Friherre Carl Gustaf Frisendorph (1663–1715)
 Friherre Magnus Gabriel Frisendorph (1668–1709), killed in action at the Battle of Poltava.

References 

Svenskt biografiskt handlexikon / I:364 (1906) Author: Herman Hofberg, Frithiof Heurlin, Viktor Millqvist, Olof Rubenson - as a part of project "Runeberg”

1617 births
1669 deaths
People from Bremen
Baronets in the Baronetage of England